From Saturday to Sunday is a 1931 Czech drama film directed by Gustav Machatý based on a screenplay by Vítězslav Nezval. Art Director on the film was Alexandr Hackenschmied.

Cast
 Ladislav H. Struna as Karel Benda, typesetter
 Magda Maděrová as Máňa, audio typist
 Jiřina Šejbalová as Nany, audio typist
 Karel Jičínský as Mr. Ervín
 R. A. Dvorský as Pavel
 F. X. Mlejnek as Announcer
 Mimi Erbenová as Nightclub attendant
 Jan Richter as Drunkard
 František Sauer as Drunkard
 Míla Svoboda as Drunkard
 Václav Menger as Police officer
 Leo Marten as Club dancer 
 Aša Vašátková as Club dancer 
 Milada Matysová as Club dancer

Production
From Saturday to Sunday was Machatý's first sound film, which caused problems with financing. Studios weren't ready to spend resources on the sound movie for a small market. In the end the financing was provided by A-B production company and the film was shot at sound stages at A-B studios in Vinohrady. Jazz inspired soundtrack was composed by Jaroslav Ježek with Nezval writing the song lyrics. In 1932 a French dubbed version of the film was released under the name D’une nuit a l’autre.

Reception
The contemporary local reviews were mixed. The critics praised the film visuals, camera work and editing, but criticised "banal and sentimental" story. The film was well-received in France.

Home release
The film was digitally restored in 2017 and released on Blu-ray and DVD by Czech Film Archive.

Further reading

References

External links

1931 films
1930s Czech-language films
Czechoslovak black-and-white films
Films directed by Gustav Machatý
1931 drama films
Czechoslovak drama films
Czech drama filmsv
1930s avant-garde and experimental films
Czech avant-garde and experimental films
Films set in Czechoslovakia